This is the discography documenting albums and singles released by American singer and songwriter Peabo Bryson.

Albums

Studio albums

Live albums

Compilation albums

Singles

Music videos

References

Discographies of American artists
Rhythm and blues discographies
Soul music discographies